Thracian kingdom may refer to:

Odrysian kingdom (c. 480 BC – 30 BC)
Sapaean kingdom (mid-1st century BC – 46 AD)